Fixerr is a 2019 Indian Hindi action drama web series created by Sakett Saawhney and produced by Riti Sawnhney under her banner Ekomkar Pictures for ALT Balaji, It is also available on ZEE5. The series marks the Web debut of actor Shabir Ahluwalia and stars Mahie Gill, Karishma Sharma, Tigmanshu Dhulia and Varun Badola in supporting roles. It was made available on ALTBalaji and ZEE5 platform on 7 October 2019.

Plot
The series revolves around Inspector Jaiveer Maalik who is accused of killing a gangster's wife during encounter and is suspended for the same. The series explores how Maalik, after his suspension takes his own route to punish the criminals by fixing with their enemies to kill them.

Cast 
 Shabir Ahluwalia as Jaiveer Maalik
 Isha Koppikar as Jayanti Jaydev
 Mahie Gill as Kesar Maalik
 Karishma Sharma as Aahana Khurrana
 Tigmanshu Dhulia as Yashpal Sherawat
 Varun Badola as Digvijay Dalmia
 Gagan Anand as Tarun Dalmia
 Mukesh Chhabra as Agantuk
 Amit Gaur as Karim Mirza
 Ravi Kesar as Shiv Pratap Singh
 Anshuman Malhotra as Arjun Maalik
 Rajat Rawail as Vicky Kapoor
 Rakhi Sawant as herself (cameo)
 Parree Pande as Airhostess

Episodes

References

External links 
 Fixerr on ZEE5
 Fixerr on ALTBalaji
 

2019 web series debuts
Indian drama web series
ALTBalaji original programming
ZEE5 original programming